Undines (also ondines) are a category of elemental beings associated with water, stemming from the alchemical writings of Paracelsus. Later writers developed the undine into a water nymph in its own right, and it continues to live in modern literature and art through such adaptations as Danish Hans Christian Andersen's "The Little Mermaid" and the Undine of Friedrich de la Motte Fouqué.

Etymology
The term Undine first appears in the alchemical writings of Paracelsus, a Renaissance alchemist and physician. It derives from the Latin word unda, meaning "wave", and first appears in Paracelsus' A Book on Nymphs, Sylphs, Pygmies, and Salamanders, and on the Other Spirits, published posthumously in 1566. Ondine is an alternative spelling, and has become a female given name.

Elementals 
Paracelsus believed that each of the four classical elements – earth, water, air and fire – is inhabited by different categories of elemental spirits, liminal creatures that share our world: gnomes, undines, sylphs and salamanders respectively. He describes these elementals as the "invisible, spiritual counterparts of visible Nature ... many resembling human beings in shape, and inhabiting worlds of their own, unknown to man because his undeveloped senses were incapable of functioning beyond the limitations of the grosser elements."

Description and common attributes

Undines are almost invariably depicted as being female, which is consistent with the ancient Greek idea that water is a female element. They are usually found in forest pools and waterfalls, and their beautiful singing voices are sometimes heard over the sound of water. The group contains many species, including nereides, limnads, naiades, mermaids and potamides.

What undines lack, compared to humans, is a soul. Marriage with a human shortens their lives on Earth, but earns them an immortal human soul.

The offspring of a union between an undine and a man are humans with a soul, but also with some kind of aquatic characteristic, called a watermark. Moses Binswanger, the protagonist in Hansjörg Schneider's Das Wasserzeichen (1997), has a cleft in his throat, for instance, which must be periodically submerged in water to prevent it from becoming painful.

Influences on Paracelsus
The ancient Greek philosopher Empedocles (c. 490 – c. 430 BC) was the first to propose that the four classical elements were sufficient to explain everything present in the world. The philosophy of nature spirits was also familiar to the ancient Egyptians and Greeks, and certainly to Paracelsus. Celtic languages scholar Henry Jenner has argued that the elementals grew out of the folklore that preceded them:

David Gallagher argues that, although they had Paracelsus as a source, 19th and 20th-century German authors found inspiration for their many versions of undine in classical literature, particularly Ovid's Metamorphoses, especially given the transformation of many of their undines into springs: Hyrie (book VII) and Egeria (book XV) are two such characters.

Cultural references

Later writers embellished Paracelsus' undine classification by developing it into a water nymph in its own right. The romance Undine by Friedrich de la Motte Fouqué, published in 1811, is based on a passage in Paracelsus' Book on Nymphs in which he relates how an undine can acquire an immortal soul by marrying a human, although it likely also borrows from the 17th-century Rosicrucian novel Comte de Gabalis.

Ondine was the title of one of the poems in Aloysius Bertrand's collection Gaspard de la Nuit of 1842. This poem inspired the first movement of Maurice Ravel's 1908 piano suite Gaspard de la nuit.

The character of Mélisande from Maurice Maeterlinck's symbolist play Pelléas et Mélisande has been seen as an Undine figure. Debussy, Sibelius, Fauré, and Schoenberg all wrote music adaptions of the play. The 1939 play Ondine by French dramatist Jean Giraudoux is also based upon Fouqué's novella, as is Ondine, a ballet by composer Hans Werner Henze and choreographer Frederick Ashton with Margot Fonteyn as Undine. Austrian author Ingeborg Bachmann, a friend of Henze's who collaborated with him frequently, attended the premiere of the ballet in London, and published her short story "Undine geht" in the collection Das dreißigste Jahr (1961), in which Undine "is neither a human nor a water spirit, but an idea".

Fouqué's Undine also exerted an influence on Hans Christian Andersen's "The Little Mermaid" (1837), and H.D. plays on this identification in her autobiographical novel HERmione (1927). Burton Pollin notes the popularity of the tale in the English-speaking world: translations in English appeared in 1818 and 1830, and a "superior version" was published by American churchman Thomas Tracy in 1839 and reprinted in 1824, 1840, 1844, and 1845; he estimates that by 1966 almost a hundred English versions had been printed, including adaptations for children. Edgar Allan Poe was profoundly influenced by Fouqué's tale, according to Pollin, which may have come about through Poe's broad reading of Walter Scott and Samuel Taylor Coleridge: Scott had derived the character of the White Lady of Avenel (The Monastery, 1820) from Undine, and a passage by Coleridge on Undine was reprinted in Tracy's 1839 edition.

French composer Claude Debussy included a piece called "Ondine" in his collection of piano preludes written in 1913 (Preludes, Book 2, No. 8).

A poem by Seamus Heaney titled "Undine" appears in his 1969 collection Door into the Dark. The poem is narrated from the first-person perspective of the water nymph itself.

Japanese pianist Yukie Nishimura composed a piece of piano music titled Undine in late 1980s.

The composer Carl Reinecke wrote the "Sonata Undine" for flute and piano, opus 167, first published in 1882.

In an issue of DC Comics "The Super Friends" (issue #14 published 1978), the heroes battle a group of people calling themselves "The Elementals".  When The Elementals are defeated, they reveal that they are elemental spirits who have possessed humans, in an attempt to become heroes to do good and earn souls.  The Elementals call themselves Gnome, Sylph, Salamander, and Undine.

The Filipino anthology film Shake, Rattle & Roll III featured a lake creature, undin, based on the undine, in one of its stories.

Undine( ウンディーネ ) is mentioned in the VOCALOID song[ こちら、幸福安心委員会です ]“Kochira, Koufuku Anshin Iinkai desu" by Utata-P

In the 1993 video game Secret of Mana, Undine is the first spirit the player encounters.

In the Japanese manga Aria and its numerous anime adaptations, gondola operators are referred to as "Prima Undine".

Another Japanese manga and anime series, Black Clover by Yuki Tabata, depicts a Water Spirit by the name of Undine who is contracted to the Queen of the Heart Kingdom. There is also a Fire Spirit, Salamander, who used to be partnered with Fana of the Eye of the Midnight Sun before she was released from her enchantment. Salamander then transferred to Captain Fuegoleon of the Crimson Lion Kings. One of the main characters, Yuno, a member of the Golden Dawn, has the Wind Spirit Sylph, who he names Bell. Currently there is no Earth Spirit that has been revealed, but the manga is ongoing.

The 2015 video game Undertale (and its sequel, Deltarune) contains a character named Undyne, a fish-like woman who is likely named after the undine.

In 2017 Ryan Jude Novelline created a gown that he displayed at New York Comic Con based on the story of Undine.

The eponymous Undine Barge Club of Philadelphia is an amateur rowing club on Boathouse Row in Philadelphia.

Species 8472, introduced in Star Trek: Voyager, became known as the Undine in Star Trek Online.

Undine is the title and the main character of a 2020 German movie directed by Christian Petzold.

In the 2002 video game Touhou Koumakyou: The Embodiment of Scarlet Devil, a spell card called Water Sign "Princess Undine" is used by Patchouli Knowledge.

Ondine's curse 

Congenital central hypoventilation syndrome, a rare medical condition in which sufferers lack autonomic control of their breathing and are hence at risk of suffocation while sleeping, is also known as Ondine's curse. Ondine, the eponymous heroine of Giraudoux's play, tells her future husband Hans, whom she has just met, that "I shall be the shoes of your feet ... I shall be the breath of your lungs". Ondine makes a pact with her uncle, the King of the Ondines, that if Hans ever deceives her he will die. After their honeymoon Hans is reunited with his first love, the Princess Bertha, and Ondine leaves him, only to be captured by a fisherman six months later. On meeting Ondine again on the day of his wedding to Bertha, Hans tells her that "all the things my body once did by itself, it does now only by special order ... A single moment of inattention and I forget to breathe". Hans and Ondine kiss, and he dies.

Critics have pointed out that medical texts on the syndrome frequently misinterpret Ondine as a vengeful or malevolent character; in the play, Ondine is not responsible for the curse and tries to save Hans.

See also 
 Gwragedd Annwn
 Mami Wata
 Melusine
 Mermaid
 Morgens
 Neck
 Rusalka
 Selkie
 Siren

References

Citations 

<!~~ not uses

~~!>

Bibliography

External links

Elementals
Female legendary creatures
Water spirits